Old World monkey is the common English name for a family of primates known taxonomically as the Cercopithecidae. Twenty-four genera and 138 species are recognized, making it the largest primate family. Old World monkey genera include baboons (genus Papio), red colobus (genus Piliocolobus) and macaques (genus Macaca). Common names for other Old World monkeys include the talapoin, guenon, colobus, douc (douc langur, genus Pygathrix), vervet, gelada, mangabey (a group of genera), langur, mandrill, surili (Presbytis), patas, and proboscis monkey. Phylogenetically, they are more closely related to apes than to New World monkeys. They diverged from a common ancestor of New World monkeys around 45 to 55 million years ago.

The smallest Old World monkey is the talapoin, with a head and body 34–37 cm in length, and weighing between 0.7 and 1.3 kg. The largest is the male mandrill,  around 70 cm in length, and weighing up to 50 kg. Old World monkeys have a variety of  facial features; some have snouts, some are flat nosed, and many exhibit coloration. Most have tails, but they are not prehensile.

Old World monkeys are native to Africa and Asia today, inhabiting numerous environments: tropical rain forests,  savannas, shrublands, and mountainous terrain. They inhabited much of Europe in the past; today, the only survivors in Europe are the Barbary macaques of Gibraltar. Whether they are native to Gibraltar or were brought by humans is unknown. 

Some Old World monkeys are arboreal, such as the colobus monkeys; others are terrestrial, such as the baboons. Most are at least partially omnivorous, but all prefer plant matter, which forms the bulk of their diets. Most are highly opportunistic, primarily eating fruit, but also consuming almost any food items available, such as flowers, leaves, bulbs and rhizomes, insects, snails, small mammals, and garbage and handouts from humans.

Taxonomic classification and phylogeny 

Two subfamilies are recognized, the Cercopithecinae, which are mainly African, but include the diverse genus of macaques, which are Asian and North African, and the Colobinae, which includes most of the Asian genera, but also the African colobus monkeys.

The Linnaean classification beginning with the superfamily is:
 Superfamily Cercopithecoidea
 Family Cercopithecidae: Old World monkeys
 Subfamily Cercopithecinae
 Tribe Cercopithecini
 Genus Allenopithecus – Allen's swamp monkey
 Genus Miopithecus – talapoins
 Genus Erythrocebus – patas monkeys
 Genus Chlorocebus
 Genus Cercopithecus – guenons
 Genus Allochrocebus – terrestrial guenons
 Tribe Papionini
 Genus Macaca – macaques
 Genus Lophocebus – crested mangabeys
 Genus Rungwecebus – kipunji
 Genus Papio – baboons
 Genus Theropithecus – gelada
 Genus Cercocebus – white-eyelid mangabeys
 Genus Mandrillus – mandrill and drill
 Subfamily Colobinae
 African group
 Genus Colobus – black-and-white colobuses
 Genus Piliocolobus – red colobuses
 Genus Procolobus – olive colobus
 Langur (leaf monkey) group     
 Genus Semnopithecus – gray langurs or Hanuman langurs
 Genus Trachypithecus – lutungs
 Genus Presbytis – surilis
 Odd-nosed group
 Genus Pygathrix – doucs
 Genus Rhinopithecus – snub-nosed monkeys
 Genus Nasalis – proboscis monkey
 Genus Simias – pig-tailed langur

The distinction between apes and monkeys is complicated by the traditional paraphyly of monkeys: Apes emerged as a sister group of Old World monkeys in the catarrhines, which are a sister group of New World monkeys. Therefore, cladistically, apes, catarrhines and related contemporary extinct groups, such as Parapithecidae, are monkeys as well, for any consistent definition of "monkey".

"Old World monkey" may also legitimately be taken to be meant to include all the catarrhines, including apes and extinct species such as Aegyptopithecus, in which case the apes, Cercopithecoidea and Aegyptopithecus as well as (under an even more expanded definition) even the Platyrrhini emerged within the Old World monkeys. Historically, monkeys from the "Old World" (Afro-Arabia), somehow drifted to the "New World" some 40 million years ago, forming the "New World monkeys" (platyrrhines). Apes would emerge later within the Afro-Arabia group.

Characteristics 

Old World monkeys are medium to large in size, and range from arboreal forms, such as the colobus monkeys, to fully terrestrial forms, such as the baboons. The smallest is the talapoin, with a head and body 34–37 cm in length, and weighing between 0.7 and 1.3 kilograms, while the largest is the male mandrill (the females of the species being significantly smaller), at around 70 cm in length, and weighing up to 50 kilograms.

Most Old World monkeys have tails (the family name means "tailed ape"), unlike the tailless apes.  The tails of Old World monkeys are not prehensile, unlike those of the New World monkeys (platyrrhines).

The distinction of catarrhines from platyrrhines depends on the structure of the rhinarium, and the distinction of Old World monkeys from apes depends on dentition (the number of teeth is the same in both, but they are shaped differently). In platyrrhines, the nostrils face sideways, while in catarrhines, they face downward. Other distinctions include both a tubular ectotympanic (ear bone), and eight, not twelve, premolars in catarrhines, giving them a dental formula of: 

Several Old World monkeys have anatomical oddities. For example, the colobus monkeys have stubs for thumbs to assist with their arboreal movement, the proboscis monkey has an extraordinary nose, while the snub-nosed monkeys have almost no nose at all.

The penis of the male mandrill is red and the scrotum is lilac; the face is also brightly colored. The coloration is more pronounced in dominant males.

Habitat and distribution 

The Old World monkeys are native to Africa and Asia today, inhabiting numerous environments: tropical rain forests,  savannas, shrublands, and mountainous terrain. They inhabited much of Europe during the Neogene period; today the only survivors in Europe are the Barbary macaques of Gibraltar.

Behaviour and ecology

Diet 

Most Old World monkeys are at least partially omnivorous, but all prefer plant matter, which forms the bulk of their diet. Leaf monkeys are the most vegetarian, subsisting primarily on leaves, and eating only a small number of insects, while the other species are highly opportunistic, primarily eating fruit, but also consuming almost any food items available, such as flowers, leaves, bulbs and rhizomes, insects, snails, and even small vertebrates. The Barbary macaque's diet consists mostly of leaves and roots, though it will also eat insects and uses cedar trees as a water source.

Reproduction 

Gestation in the Old World monkeys lasts between five and seven months. Births are usually single, although, as with humans, twins occur occasionally. The young are born relatively well-developed, and are able to cling onto their mother's fur with their hands from birth. Compared with most other mammals, they take a long time to reach sexual maturity, with four to six years being typical of most species.

Social systems 

In most species, daughters remain with their mothers for life, so that the basic social group among Old World monkeys is a matrilineal troop. Males leave the group on reaching adolescence, and find a new troop to join. In many species, only a single adult male lives with each group, driving off all rivals, but others are more tolerant, establishing hierarchical relationships between dominant and subordinate males. Group sizes are highly variable, even within species, depending on the availability of food and other resources.

See also 

 List of Old World monkey species
 List of primates by population

References

External links 

 
 

Old World monkeys
Extant Oligocene first appearances